Tamo Aí na Atividade (Portuguese for "Here We Are, Up to Something") is the sixth studio album by Brazilian alternative rock band Charlie Brown Jr., released in December 2004 through EMI. The band's first album since 1999's Preço Curto... Prazo Longo to be produced by Rick Bonadio, it spawned the hit singles "Champanhe e Água Benta" and the titular "Tamo Aí na Atividade". Also notable is "Todos Iguais", the only credited work of bassist Champignon as a drummer in all of his career. The music video for "Champanhe e Água Benta" received nominations for the MTV Video Music Brazil award in the "Video of the Year", "Best Rock Video" and "Best Editing in a Video" categories in 2005; directors Roberto Oliveira and Alex Miranda were nominated in the "Best Direction in a Video" category.

It received positive reviews upon its release, awarding the band a Multishow Brazilian Music Award nomination and a Latin Grammy Award for Best Portuguese Language Rock or Alternative Album in 2005; the first one to be won by Charlie Brown Jr. after their previous works Nadando com os Tubarões and Bocas Ordinárias received nominations. Selling over 100,000 copies, it received a Platinum certification by Pro-Música Brasil.

The recording sessions of Tamo Aí na Atividade were plagued by creative divergences and clashes between vocalist Chorão and his bandmates, which led to a deterioration of the relations between them. In 2005, shortly after the album's release, Champignon, guitarist Marcão and drummer Renato Pelado all left Charlie Brown Jr., and Chorão put the band on hold for a brief period of time before reactivating it with a new line-up. Champignon and Marcão would only return to the group in 2011.

Critical reception
Anderson Nascimento of Galeria Musical gave the album a positive rating of 4 out of 5 stars, praising the inclusion of electronic beats and interludes and Rick Bonadio's "competent production".

Track listing

Personnel
 Charlie Brown Jr.
 Chorão – vocals
 Champignon – bass guitar, backing vocals, beatboxing, drums in "Todos Iguais"
 Marcão – electric guitar
 Renato Pelado – drums

 Additional musicians
 DJ Fernando – scratches in "Di-SK8 Eu Vim" and "Eu Vim de Santos, Sou Charlie Brown"

Certifications

References

2004 albums
EMI Records albums
Charlie Brown Jr. albums
Albums produced by Rick Bonadio
Latin Grammy Award for Best Portuguese Language Rock or Alternative Album